The Society of Royal Cumberland Youths (SRCY) is a society of church bellringers, founded in 1747 and based in London. They are one of the two major historical ringing Societies based in London, the other being the Ancient Society of College Youths.

Formation of the Society
It is claimed that a prominent London ringing Society, known as the London Scholars, rang the bells at Shoreditch church as William Augustus, Duke of Cumberland and second son of George II, passed by on his return from the Battle of Culloden in April 1746. Victory was hailed everywhere and it became popular to adopt the name 'Cumberland' at every opportunity and thus the London Scholars changed their name.

Whether or not the Society of Royal Cumberland Youths (The word 'Royal' was added in the 1870s) descends from the London Scholars, there is no doubt about the foundation of the Society in its present form, which, according to the original Name Book, now housed in the Guildhall Library, was on 6 September 1747.

The early Society
The lists of members from the first century of the Society's existence shows that at that time it attracted some of the great names in ringing history, such as John Reeves, George Gross and William Shipway, and records of the many first performances achieved at that time still exist in the ringing chambers of City churches.

Gross's outstanding achievement, remarkable in its time, was the celebrated peal of 12,000 Oxford Treble Bob Royal at Shoreditch on 27 March 1784, in 9 hours and 5 minutes, which he conducted. The Society marked the 200th anniversary of this peal with one of 12,000 Middlesex Surprise Royal on 27 March 1984.

In 1896 the Society welcomed its first female member, Mrs George Williams. At this time women were still excluded from ringing societies, which were typically male-only organisations. Mrs Williams was the first lady to ring a peal.

London towers
The Headquarters of the SRCY is St Martin-in-the-Fields, and it looks after Shoreditch. It also has strong connections with Spitalfields, Holborn and Clerkenwell.

Publicity
While the SRCY is a London-based Society, it has two Country meetings every year (March and July) to different parts of the UK so it's easier for other members to take part.

There have been several tours to the US and Australia in recent times, which has resulted in US based members getting together on their own accord.

During the 2010 National 12 Bell Eliminators, held on 27 March, the SRCY hosted the Eliminator at Shoreditch. During this event ITV London Tonight covered part of the event, including interviewing the Master at the time, Mary Holden.

References

External links
Society of Royal Cumberland Youths homepage

1747 establishments in England
Organizations established in 1747
Musical groups from London
Bell ringing societies in England